Local elections were held in Muntinlupa on May 13, 2019 within the 2019 Philippine general election. Voters elected for the elective local posts in the city: the mayor, vice mayor, the congressman, and the 16 councilors, eight each in the two local legislative districts of Muntinlupa.

Candidates

District Representative

Mayor

Vice Mayor

Councilor

Team Fresnedi

Team Red Mariñas

1st District

|-bgcolor=black
|colspan=8|

2nd District

|-bgcolor=black
|colspan=8|

External links
2019 Election Results for the City of Muntinlupa

2019 Philippine local elections
Elections in Muntinlupa
May 2019 events in the Philippines
2019 elections in Metro Manila